The Department of the Pacific or Pacific Department was a major command (Department) of the United States Army from 1853 to 1858.  It replaced the Pacific Division, and was itself replaced by the Department of California and the Department of Oregon.

Formation
The Department of the Pacific was created on October 31, 1853, at San Francisco, California, replacing the older Pacific Division, (1848–53) and abolishing the existing 10th (California) and 11th (Oregon) Departments, consolidating them within the new department.  The department reported directly to the headquarters of the Army in Washington, D.C.  It oversaw the military affairs in the country west of the Rocky Mountains (California, Oregon Territory, and Washington Territory), except for the Utah Territory and the Territory of New Mexico east of the 110th meridian west, (thus including most of modern Arizona and southern Nevada).

On September 2, 1854, the headquarters was moved to Benicia Barracks, in Benicia, California.

From 1855 to 1857 the Puget Sound District was organized.

In January 1857, the headquarters again returned to San Francisco.

On January 14, 1858, the Utah Territory was placed within the department but soon removed into the Department of Utah, in 1858, that remained until 1861.

Commanders 
 Brevet Brigadier General Ethan A. Hitchcock 1853–1854
 Brevet Major General John E. Wool 1854–1857
 Brevet Brigadier General Newman S. Clarke 1857–1858

Posts 
 Post of Alcatraz Island or Fort Alcatraz, California 1853–1907
 Fort Bellingham, Washington Territory  1855–1860
 Benicia Arsenal, Benicia, California 1851–1964
 Benicia Barracks, California 1852–1866
 Fort Boise, Idaho, 1863–1912
 Fort Bragg, California 1857–1864.
 Fort Churchill, Nevada, 1860–1869
 Fort Colville, Washington Territory, 1825–1870
 Fort Dalles, Oregon, 1850–1867
 Fort Klamath, Oregon, 1863–1890
 Roop's Fort, Fort Defiance, Susanville, California 1853–1863 
 Fort Douglas, Utah Territory, 1862–1991
 Drum Barracks, California, 1862–1870
 Fort Gaston, California 1859–1892
 Fort Humboldt, California 1853–1867
 Fort Jones, California, 1852–1858
 Fort Mohave, Arizona Territory 1859–1890
 Fort Point San José, San Francisco, California, 1853–1882
 Fort Point, San Francisco, California 1853–1886
 New San Diego Depot, San Diego, California 1851–1866.
 Fort Steilacoom, Washington Territory, 1849–1868
 Fort Yuma, California 1851–1883
 Fort Vancouver, Washington Territory 1853–1879
 Fort Tejon, California 1854–1861, 1863–1864.
 Camp Burton, California 1855
 Fort Cascades, Washington Territory 1855–1861
 Fort Yamhill, Oregon (1856–1866)
 Fort Simcoe, Washington Territory, 1856–1859
 Fort Townsend, Washington Territory 1856–1861
 Fort Walla Walla, Washington Territory 1856–1911
 Fort Crook, California 1857–1869 
 Fort Hoskins, Oregon, 1857–1865
 Fort Ter-Waw, California 1857–1862 
 Camp at Pardee's Ranch, California 1858–1865

Disbandment
On September 13, 1858, the Department of the Pacific was disbanded, replaced by two new departments: the Department of California and the Department of Oregon. The Department of California included the territory west of the Rockies, the Umpqua and Rogue River districts in Oregon, Utah and New Mexico. The Department of Oregon included the Oregon and Washington Territories.

Reborn in the Civil War
During the American Civil War the army again reorganized, and on January 15, 1861, the independent Pacific Department was reconstituted by consolidating the Departments of California and Oregon. The first commander of the new Department of the Pacific was Colonel (Brevet Brigadier General) Albert Sidney Johnston who was later to become a prominent General in the Confederate Army.

Civil War commanders
 Albert Sidney Johnston, 1861 (resigned to join the Confederacy)
 Edwin Vose Sumner, 1861
 George Wright, 1861–1864
 Irvin McDowell, 1864–1865

Districts
The Department of the Pacific had six subordinate military districts during the Civil War:
 District of Oregon (headquarters at Fort Vancouver) January 15, 1861 – July 27, 1865
 District of California (headquarters at San Francisco, co-located with Department of the Pacific). Independent command from Department from July 1, 1864 – July 27, 1865
 District of Southern California (headquarters at Drum Barracks) September 25, 1861 – July 27, 1865
 District of Humboldt (headquarters at Fort Humboldt) December 12, 1861 – July 27, 1865
 District of Utah (headquarters at Fort Douglas). August 6, 1862 – July 27, 1865
 District of Arizona (headquarters at Prescott) March 7, 1865 – July 27, 1865

Reorganized out of existence
On July 27, 1865, the Military Division of the Pacific was created under Major General Henry W. Halleck, replacing the Department of the Pacific, consisting of the Department of the Columbia that now consisted of the state of Oregon and the territories of Washington and Idaho and the expanded Department of California that now consisted of the states of California and Nevada and the Territory of New Mexico and Territory of Arizona.

Philippine Expedition
On 30 May 1898, Gen. Wesley Merritt established in San Francisco the Headquarters, US Expeditionary Forces and Department of the Pacific for the campaign to support Adm. Dewey's forces in the Philippines during the Spanish–American War.

At the end of March 1900, the complexities involved in dealing with the guerrillas and governing the islands led to the transformation of what had been the Department of the Pacific into the Philippine Department with four geographical departments, each of which was, in turn, divided into military districts. This step also brought an end to the Eighth Corps.

See also
 Arizona in the American Civil War
 California in the Civil War
 Idaho in the American Civil War
 Washington in the American Civil War
 Nevada in the American Civil War
 New Mexico in the American Civil War
 Oregon in the American Civil War
 Utah in the American Civil War

References

External links
 Militarymuseum.org: "Proposed Invasion of California from Texas"

Pacific
Pacific, Department of the
American frontier
Military history of California
West Coast of the United States
Pacific Coast Theater of the American Civil War
California in the American Civil War
Arizona in the American Civil War
Arizona Territory
Idaho in the American Civil War
Nevada in the American Civil War
Oregon in the American Civil War
Utah in the American Civil War
Utah Territory
Washington (state) in the American Civil War
Washington Territory
1853 establishments in California
1858 disestablishments in California
1861 establishments in California
1865 disestablishments in California
1853 establishments in the United States
1858 disestablishments in the United States
1861 establishments in the United States
1865 disestablishments in the United States
Hawaiian Kingdom–United States relations